Bhawani Singh Pathania  (born 20 August 1974) is an Indian politician and a Member of Legislative Assembly (MLA) representing Fatehpur in the Himachal Pradesh Legislative Assembly in India. He won over Indian National Congress ticket and Symbol.

Reference

Living people
1974 births
Indian National Congress politicians from Himachal Pradesh
Himachal Pradesh MLAs 2017–2022
People from Kangra district